General Raheel Sharif  (born 16 June 1956), is a retired four-star army general of the Pakistan Army who served as the 9th Chief of Army Staff from 29 November 2013 to 29 November 2016. After his retirement as Pakistan's army chief, he was appointed as the commander-in-chief of the Islamic Military Counter Terrorism Coalition, a 41-nation alliance of Muslim countries headquartered in Riyadh, Saudi Arabia.

Under General Raheel Sharif's command, the Pakistan Army carried out anti-terrorism operations across the country. The most important of these was in North Waziristan, namely Operation Zarb-e-Azb which eradicated taliban strongholds in the region and stabilized the entire country. He expanded the role of paramilitaries in Karachi which is widely credited with reducing the level of violence in Pakistan's commercial capital. The Pakistani military under his command has also supported the democratically elected government on the federal level and the Baloch provincial and local government in ending the Balochistan insurgency by pursuing reconciliation and integration of former militants back into mainstream Pakistani society. General Sharif also developed a new brigade-level military unit to help protect and secure the China-Pakistan Economic Corridor which runs through Balochistan province. General Sharif helped to develop Pakistan's indigenous defence industry which resulted in the savings of more than $1.14 billion of Pakistan's forex, over a year and half time period.

General Sharif achieved his objectives by strengthening the role of the military in affairs directly concerning national security and foreign policy, while leaving the civilian government of Prime Minister Nawaz Sharif in control of social and economic policy. and reconciled Pakistan with America by striking against militant groups near the Afghan border, carrying out Pakistan's first joint military exercises with Russia, and deepening relations with China.

For the first time in twenty years, a general retired on time (without seeking extension of tenure) with General Sharif's retirement. General Sharif said that he was "ready to serve Pakistan" even after his retirement. General Sharif left a respected legacy in Pakistan. He is widely credited with reducing terrorism inside the country; violence in the country was reduced to its lowest level since 2006, with an overall decline of 80% in terrorist attacks under his tenure.

Early life
General Raheel Sharif was born in Quetta, capital of Pakistan's Balochistan province. He belongs to a Punjabi Rajput family with roots in Punjab (in the town of Kunjah, Gujrat). He has a prominent military background, and is the son of (late) Major Muhammad Sharif. He is the youngest sibling among three brothers and two sisters. his elder brother Major Shabbir Sharif (28 April 1943 – 6 December 1971) was a Pakistan Army officer who was posthumously awarded the Nishan-e-Haider during the Indo-Pakistani War of 1971. Shabbir Sharif is regarded as the highest decorated military officer of the Pakistan Army who received both the Nishan-e-Haider (1971) and Sitara-e-Jurat (1965), and received the Sword of Honour at Pakistan Military Academy upon graduation. His second brother, Captain Mumtaz Sharif, served in Pakistan Army and for his bravery in saving soldiers from a burning tank during an exercise accident, was awarded Sitara-e-Basalat, he received an early retirement due to his injuries. From his mother's side, he is related to Major Raja Aziz Bhatti, another Nishan-e-Haider recipient, who was declared as the martyr of Indo-Pakistani War of 1965 by Pakistan. Raheel Sharif is married and has three children, two sons and a daughter.

Military service
Sharif received his formal education from the Government College in Lahore and afterward attended the 54th long course (L/C) of Pakistan Military Academy (PMA) . After his passing out in October 1976, he was commissioned into the 6th Battalion of the Frontier Force Regiment, where his elder brother had also served. He served as an adjutant to the Pakistan Military Academy and joined an infantry brigade in Gilgit. He has the distinction of commanding two infantry units, 6FF and 26FF as a Lt. Colonel and also as an Acting Brigade Commander in Sialkot during 1999 Kargil War. During the Army monitoring of 2000 he was given control of Gujranwala district and is credited for bringing substantial administrative and social reforms to the area. As a Brigadier, he commanded two infantry brigades. In 2001, he was appointed Chief of Staff of 30 Corps Gujranwala. He was later posted as Chief of Staff at Corps Headquarters Quetta, Balochistan. In 2004 he was selected to join the prestigious Royal College of Defence Studies, UK where he graduated with distinction. 
In 2005 he was promoted to the rank of Major General and assigned command of the coveted 11th Infantry Division in Lahore. After commanding the division for over two years, he was posted as Commandant of the Pakistan Military Academy, Kakul. Following his promotion to Lieutenant General, Sharif served as a Corps Commander Gujranwala and then as the Inspector General for Training and Evaluation of the Pakistan Army before becoming the 15th Chief of Army Staff of Pakistan.

Role in Counter Terrorism

As the Inspector General for Training and Evaluation, he enhanced the military colleges in the country and provided unconventional warfare training to the troops. He also deals with the evaluation of military doctrines and war strategies with a view to shaping future training programs. He changed the army's focus more towards carrying out counter-insurgency operations against Tehrik-i-Taliban (Pakistani Taliban) militants.

General Sharif has spearheaded a thinking in Pakistan military since 2007 that fighting Taliban inside Pakistan is more important than focusing on India, Pakistan's arch rival since independence.

Chief of Army Staff

On 27 November 2013, Sharif was appointed as the 15th Chief of Army Staff of the Pakistan Army by Prime Minister Nawaz Sharif.

In 2013, Sharif was conferred with Nishan-e-Imtiaz (military). He has the distinction of being conferred with 5 international military awards, highest for any Pakistani Army Chief till date, in recognition for his outstanding leadership in the fight against terrorism and bringing stability to the region. General Raheel Sharif retired as the Chief of Army Staff on 29 November 2016.

Islamic Military Counter Terrorism Coalition 

In April 2017, Raheel got the approval of the Government of Pakistan to serve as head of Islamic Military Counter Terrorism Coalition a 41-nation Islamic military alliance being headquartered in Saudi Arabia.

Awards and decorations

Foreign Decorations

Effective dates of promotion

References

External links

Living people
1956 births
People from Gujrat District
People from Quetta
Pakistani generals
Government College University, Lahore alumni
National Defence University, Pakistan alumni
Pakistan Military Academy alumni
Bundeswehr University Munich alumni
Chiefs of Army Staff, Pakistan
Guerrilla warfare theorists
Recipients of Hilal-i-Imtiaz
Recipients of Nishan-e-Imtiaz
Foreign recipients of the Legion of Merit
Frontier Force Regiment officers
Punjabi people
Military snipers